Not Alone may refer to:

Albums
 Not Alone (album), a charity compilation album for Médecins Sans Frontières, 2006
 Not Alone – Rivers Cuomo and Friends: Live at Fingerprints, an EP by Rivers Cuomo, 2009

Songs
 "Not Alone" (Aram Mp3 song), Armenian entry for Eurovision 2014
 "Not Alone" (Bernard Butler song), 1998
 "Not Alone" (Linkin Park song), 2010
 "Not Alone" (Park Jung-min song), 2011
 "Not Alone" (Zhang Liyin song), 2014
 "Not Alone", by All That Remains from The Fall of Ideals, 2006
 "Not Alone", by BTS from BTS World: Original Soundtrack, 2019
 "Not Alone", by Dala from Best Day, 2012
 "Not Alone", by Fleur East, 2020
 "Not Alone", by Kate Ryan, 2014
 "Not Alone", by NCT 127 from Neo Zone, 2020
 "Not Alone", by Nobuo Uematsu from the Final Fantasy IX soundtrack, 2000
 "Not Alone", by Red from Until We Have Faces, 2011
 "Not Alone", by Seventeen, 2021
 "Not Alone", by Thrown into Exile from Thrown into Exile, 2013
 "Not Alone", by Withered Hand from New Gods, 2014
 "Not Alone", from A Very Potter Musical, 2009

See also
 "Not Alone Any More", a song by the Traveling Wilburys, 1988 
 We Are Not Alone (disambiguation)
 You're Not Alone (disambiguation)